Tingal is an ethnic group in Northern Sudan. They speak Tingal, a Niger–Congo language. They number at least several thousands.

References
Joshua Project

Ethnic groups in Sudan